Zaviyeh Mashali (also Romanized as Zāvīyeh Mash‘alī and Zāveyeh-ye Mash‘alī; also known as Mash‘alī) is a village in Qeblehi Rural District, in the Central District of Dezful County, Khuzestan Province, Iran. At the 2006 census, its population was 836, in 147 families.

References 

Populated places in Dezful County